Cargninia is an extinct genus of basal lepidosauromorph from the Late Triassic of Brazil. The type and only known species is Cargninia enigmatica. It is known from the holotype UFRGS PV 1027 T, a partial left dentary (lower jaw bone) found in what is now Faxinal do Soturno, Rio Grande do Sul, southern Brazil, in the geopark Paleorrota. This locality is from the middle section of the Norian-age Caturrita Formation. Cargninia was named by José Fernando Bonaparte, César Leandro Schultz, Marina Bento Soares and Agustín G. Martinelli in 2010. The generic name honors Daniel Cargnin, a Brazilian priest and fossil collector, and the specific name means “enigmatic”, in reference to its uncertain phylogenetic placement.

The preserved dentary has small, peg-like teeth, with the underlying jaw bone about four times deeper than the height of each tooth crown. The jaw was originally collected with eleven preserved teeth and two or three more spaces for broken teeth. However, during preparation the front half of the fossil was destroyed, leaving only the rear part of the jaw with five preserved teeth and one or two empty spaces. Up to 20 teeth may have been present in a complete lower jaw. The teeth are positioned apicolingually (slightly inwards of the upper edge of the jaw bone). The penultimate tooth in the back of the jaw has a higher attachment point and its base is cemented to the jaw bone. The jaw as a whole can be characterized as having pleuroacrodont tooth implantation.

Cargninia was originally described as a lepidosaur (crown-group lepidosauromorph), possibly related to the gliding kuehneosaurids. A 2020 redescription later considered it a valid, albeit fragmentary, lepidosauromorph with uncertain relations to other members of the group. Its pleuroacrodont dentition is similar to Gephyrosaurus (a basal rhynchocephalian) and Gueragama (a basal acrodontan squamate), which are each early members of major lepidosaur lineages with acrodont dentition. In the absence of more data, Cargninia's condition is considered to be a case of homoplasy (convergent evolution). Several additional pleuroacrodont jaw fragments are known from Faxinal do Soturno, though a lack of overlap prevents an unambiguous referral to Cargninia.

References 

Prehistoric reptile genera
Triassic lepidosauromorphs
Late Triassic reptiles of South America
Triassic Brazil
Fossils of Brazil
Fossil taxa described in 2010
Taxa named by José Bonaparte